School District 70 Pacific Rim (formerly School District 70 Alberni) is a school district on the west coast of Vancouver Island in British Columbia. The board office and the majority of the schools are located in Port Alberni but the district extends to the west to include Ucluelet, Tofino, and Bamfield.

At the request of the Board of School Trustees, the name of the district was changed from School District 70 Alberni to School District 70 Pacific Rim by the Province of British Columbia through an Order-in-Council on September 20, 2020.

Schools

See also
List of school districts in British Columbia

External links
BC Ministry of Education district's school information

References

  Province of British Columbia Order-in-Council 528/2020 dated September 20, 2020

Port Alberni
70